The 1999 Internationaux de Strasbourg was a women's tennis tournament played on outdoor clay courts in Strasbourg, France that was part of Tier III of the 1999 WTA Tour.It was the 13th edition of The tournament and was held from 17 May until 23 May 1999. Unseeded Jennifer Capriati won the singles title and $27,500 first-prize money.

Entrants

Seeds

Other entrants
The following players received wildcards into the singles main draw:
  Laurence Andretto
  Stéphanie Foretz

The following players received wildcards into the doubles main draw:
  Magdalena Maleeva /  Miriam Oremans

The following players received entry from the singles qualifying draw:

  Adriana Gerši
  Denisa Chládková
  Janet Lee
  Lubomira Bacheva

The following players received entry as lucky losers:
  Jolene Watanabe

The following players received entry from the doubles qualifying draw:

  Joannette Kruger /  Li Fang

Finals

Singles

 Jennifer Capriati defeated  Elena Likhovtseva, 6–1, 6–3
 It was Capriati's 7th career title, and her first since 1993.

Doubles

 Elena Likhovtseva /  Ai Sugiyama defeated  Alexandra Fusai /  Nathalie Tauziat, 2–6, 7–6(8–6), 6–1

References

External links
 Tournament draws

Internationaux de Strasbourg
1999
Internationaux de Strasbourg
May 1999 sports events in Europe